Bent Vejlby (20 March 1924 – 31 August 2020) was a Danish film actor and school teacher. He appeared in 40 films between 1952 and 1973. He was born in Vejlby, Denmark.

Filmography

 Kærlighedsdoktoren (1952)
 Mig og min familie (1957)
 Tag til marked i Fjordby (1957)
 Styrmand Karlsen (1958)
 Vi er allesammen tossede (1959)
 Kvindelist og kærlighed (1960)
 Sømand i knibe (1960)
 Reptilicus (1961)
 Gøngehøvdingen (1961)
 Soldaterkammerater på sjov (1962)
 Dronningens vagtmester (1963)
 Støv for alle pengene (1963)
 Majorens oppasser (1964)
 Slottet (1964)
 Når enden er go' (1964)
 Mord for åbent tæppe (1964)
 Flådens friske fyre (1965)
 Een pige og 39 sømænd (1965)
 Næsbygårds arving (1965)
 Nu stiger den (1966)
 Min søsters børn (1966)
 Slap af, Frede! (1966)
 I stykker (1966)
 Det er ikke appelsiner, det er heste (1967)
 Onkel Joakims hemmelighed (1967)
 Mig og min lillebror (1967)
 Det var en lørdag aften (1968)
 Soldaterkammerater på bjørnetjeneste (1968)
 Mig og min lillebror og storsmuglerne (1968)
 Romulus den store (1969)
 Helle for Lykke (1969)
 Pigen fra Egborg (1969)
 Mazurka på sengekanten (1970)
 Premiere (1970)
 Til lykke Hansen (1971)
 Sejle op ad åen (1972)
 Man sku være noget ved musikken (1972)
 På vej til Hilda (1972)
 Olsen-bandens store kup (1972)
 Gips (1973)

References

External links

1924 births
2020 deaths
Danish male film actors
People from Aarhus